Carlen v Drury (1812) 35 ER 61 is a UK partnership law case, which is often cited for a broader principle in UK company law that the court generally does not allow litigation by members where a procedure for redress is set out in the articles of association.

Facts
The Bankside Brewery was a partnership, composed of three hundred people, that began on 21 June 1808 for a term of 99 years. Drury was one of three managers, and the regulations of the partnership contained a provision for managers to be removed on a vote of the annual general meeting on Lady Day, Michaelmas. In the case of alleged misbehaviour, a special general meeting could be called by a committee of twelve partners who audited the accounts. The partnership could be dissolved after two consecutive votes of three quarters of all the partners, with another subsequent confirmation vote in general meeting.

Six of the committee partners alleged that the managers and the other six committee partners were guilty of gross mismanagement, and applied to court directly for an injunction to dissolve the partnership, and appoint a receiver.

Judgment
Sir Samuel Romilly and Lord Eldon held that the court had no jurisdiction to interfere with the partnership. In the first instance, the right of redress for the aggrieved partners was the procedures set out in the regulations of the partnership itself. Lord Eldon's judgment said the following.

See also
UK company law
UK partnership law

Notes

United Kingdom company case law
Court of Chancery cases
1812 in case law
1812 in British law